Roger Pettersson (born 4 January 1973) is a Swedish boxer. He competed in the men's light middleweight event at the 1996 Summer Olympics.

References

1973 births
Living people
Swedish male boxers
Olympic boxers of Sweden
Boxers at the 1996 Summer Olympics
Sportspeople from Dalarna County
Light-middleweight boxers
20th-century Swedish people